The following table contains information on the historical population of the city of Poznań in western Poland.

For details of the historical developments, see History of Poznań.

The above figures do not include a significant number of students (approximately 60,000) resident temporarily in Poznań during the academic year.

See also
History of Poznań
Historical demographics of Poland

References
Jerzy Topolski (red) Dzieje Poznania Warszawa-Poznań 1988-, Państwowe Wydawnictwo Naukowe 
Maria Trzeciakowska, Lech Trzeciakowski, W dziewiętnastowiecznym Poznaniu. Życie codzienne miasta 1815-1914, Poznań 1982, Wydawnictwo Poznańskie 
Current population data from the Polish Central Statistical Office (GUS)

History of Poznań
Poznan